is a motorway in Germany. It branches off the A 3 at the Würzburg-West triangle and ends near the border with Switzerland.

The oldest part of the A 81 between the Weinsberg intersection (A 6) near Heilbronn and Dreieck Leonberg (A 8) near Stuttgart was finished in the years 1938 to 1940. This section included the first tunnel built for an autobahn, the  first Engelberg tunnel near Leonberg. When Weinsberg-Leonberg was upgraded to 3+3 lanes in the 1970s, the tunnel with its two lanes each and steep grades (up to 6%) became something of a bottleneck. In 1999 a new  Engelberg tunnel was opened.

Original plans called for the A 81 to be continued northwards skirting the north-west of Würzburg to join up with the A 7, but these plans were later abandoned. Instead, the A 81 shares a part of the A 8 to the Stuttgart intersection and then continues south on a motorway that was built as A 831 to Gärtringen, where it meets the original line again at a partly finished intersection. As a result of this change of plans, Gärtringen became one of the few exits in the German autobahn network that leave to the left.

Further south, the terrain required some spectacular engineering, including a  bridge near Horb that spans 125 m above the Neckar river. Currently, the A 81 ends near Singen.

Exit list 

 

 
 

 

 
 

 

 

 

 
 

 
 

  

  
 (Hohentwiel) 

 
|}

External links 

81
A081
A081